The Racova is a right tributary of the river Bârlad in Romania. It discharges into the Bârlad near the city Vaslui. The Pușcași Dam is located on this river.

References

Rivers of Romania
Rivers of Vaslui County